Julie Nathanson (born May 10, 1975) is an American actress most notable for voicing Rosalie Rowan in The Zeta Project, Silver Banshee and Jewelee in the DC animated film Suicide Squad: Hell to Pay, and Jess Black in Ubisoft's Far Cry 5. Since 2011, she has voiced Belle in various media, replacing Paige O'Hara and Jodi Benson.

Biography
Nathanson graduated from Tufts University before beginning her career in acting. She was first seen in the 1997 television film Kiss & Tell and subsequently appeared on several television series and films such as Beverly Hills, 90210 (1996–97), Soldier of Fortune, Inc. (1998–99), The Zeta Project (2001–02), and Spider-Man: The New Animated Series (2003). Since 2004, she is also often heard voicing different characters in video games.

In 2000, she wrote some episodes of the television series Just Deal and has also been nominated for a Writers Guild of America Award in the category Best Screenplay for a Teen series.

Nathanson is best known as a frequent voice actress with the Final Fantasy series. She also voices Chill in the Skylanders series, Scarlett Turner in Elena of Avalor, Samantha Maxis in Call of Duty: Black Ops, Lampita Pasionado in Psychonauts, Medic in StarCraft II: Wings of Liberty, and Robin in The Powerpuff Girls.

Filmography

Voice over roles

Film

Television

Video games

Live action roles

Film

Television

References

External links
 

Living people
American television actresses
American video game actresses
American voice actresses
Place of birth missing (living people)
Tufts University alumni
20th-century American actresses
21st-century American actresses
1975 births